Dagger Kiss is an American fantasy adventure series created by and starring Girl/Girl Scene creator Tucky Williams. It premiered on the streaming website Tello on February 14, 2016. The eight episode series now airs for free on Amazon Prime and on its official website. On July 1, 2016, Williams announced a second season.

Plot 
Arden (Tucky Williams) travels to Earth after the death of her lover Mia (Stoya).  Arden is attacked, and her life is saved by Katia, who is a stranger to Arden.  Katia takes Arden under her wing as Arden is pursued by the sorcerer Zareth.

Cast

Main 
 Tucky Williams as Arden
 Amanda K. Morales as Katia
 Stoya as Mia

Recurring 
 Roni Jonah as Jenna
 Thomas J. Phillips as Zareth
 Silvio Wolf Busch as Yamin
 Jessica Paige York as Emily

Distribution 
All eight episodes of the series were released weekly from February - April 2016 on the streaming service tello Films. Williams began releasing episodes on YouTube in March 2016.  The series is now airing on Amazon Video.  It can also be found on Vimeo.

Cultural Impact 
Dagger Kiss has been called "a lesbian Lord of the Rings."  Dagger Kiss is a female, LGBT take on standard fantasy-adventure tales. It is the first time a fantasy series, TV show or movie has had two lead female characters who are explicitly lovers.

External links 
 
 Dagger Kiss on Amazon

References 

American fantasy television series
2016 American television series debuts
2016 web series debuts
Fantasy web series
American LGBT-related web series
Fantasy adventure web series